Benigno Zaccagnini (17 April 1912 – 5 November 1989) was an Italian politician and physician.

Biography
Born in Faenza, he graduated in Pediatrics in 1937. During World War II he acted as partisan, collaborating with Arrigo Boldrini in the liberation of Romagna.

Zaccagnini was among the founders of the Christian Democracy (DC), and was elected at the Constituent Assembly (1946) and the Chamber of Deputies (1948) of the new-born Italian Republic. He was a member of the Christian Democratic wing more favourable to a collaboration with left (or centre-left) parties. He was confirmed at the Chambers of Deputies until 1979, when he was elected to the Italian Senate.

In 1959 Zaccagnini was appointed Minister of Labour and Social Security in the Segni II Cabinet, a position he maintained also in the following government led by Fernando Tambroni. In 1960 he was appointed Minister of Public Works in the Fanfani III Cabinet.

In 1975 he was elected National Secretary of DC, remaining in place until 1980 when he was replaced by Flaminio Piccoli. In 1984 he was elected in the European Parliament. In 1978, during his tenure as national secretary, Democrazia Cristiana's president and Zaccagnini's mentor Aldo Moro was kidnapped by terrorist group Brigate Rosse. The prisoner wrote numerous letters to Zaccagnini, initially invoking his help, then accusing him and other DC leaders of sacrificing him in order to save the new government, which Moro had been instrumental to form.

Zaccagnini died at Ravenna in 1989.

External links
Biography 

1912 births
1989 deaths
People from Faenza
Christian Democracy (Italy) politicians
Government ministers of Italy
Members of the Constituent Assembly of Italy
Deputies of Legislature I of Italy
Deputies of Legislature II of Italy
Deputies of Legislature III of Italy
Deputies of Legislature IV of Italy
Deputies of Legislature V of Italy
Deputies of Legislature VI of Italy
Deputies of Legislature VII of Italy
Deputies of Legislature VIII of Italy
Senators of Legislature IX of Italy
Senators of Legislature X of Italy
Politicians of Emilia-Romagna
MEPs for Italy 1984–1989
Italian resistance movement members